Emil Christensen (23 November 1890 – 10 October 1973) was a Danish wrestler. He competed in the Greco-Roman middleweight event at the 1920 Summer Olympics.

References

External links
 

1890 births
1973 deaths
Olympic wrestlers of Denmark
Wrestlers at the 1920 Summer Olympics
Danish male sport wrestlers
Sportspeople from Frederiksberg
20th-century Danish people